The Fort Fairfield–Andover Border Crossing is an international border crossing between the towns of Fort Fairfield, Maine, United States, and Perth-Andover, New Brunswick, Canada on the Canada–US border, joining Maine State Route 161 (Boundary Line Road) and New Brunswick Route 190 (Fort Road).  The United States border station was built in 1933, and was listed on the National Register of Historic Places in 2014.  The Canada border station was built in 2007, replacing the previous facility that was built in 1954.  This crossing was a historical flashpoint during the bloodless Aroostook War of the 1830s, in which the US and Great Britain disputed the border's location.  That dispute was ended with the Webster-Ashburton Treaty in 1842.

United States station
It consists of a single Colonial Revival brick building, with flanking garage sections (for performing vehicle inspections), and a projecting two-lane porte-cochere. The building is  stories in height, five bays wide, and topped by a gable roof. On either side are banks of four garage bays, some of which have been repurposed as office space and no longer serve their historic function. The main entrance to the building is now through a lobby area in one of the former garage bays on the west side. The interior of the building is divided into sections for customs and immigration processing respectively.

Prior to the construction of this station, customs and immigration formalities took place at offices in the town of Fort Fairfield.  With the advent of increased automobile traffic in the 1920s, as well as the need to interdict the movement of contraband liquor due to Prohibition, the federal government realized the need for border stations where immigration formalities and vehicle inspections could be performed close to the border, and consequently planned the construction of a series of such stations.  The Fort Fairfield station is a "Type 1" rural station that was probably designed by Louis A. Simon, head of the Office of the Supervising Architect of the United States Treasury Department, and was built in 1933 with funding from the Public Works Administration.  It is the only surviving station of this type to retain the original height of its porte-cochere.  It was listed on the National Register of Historic Places in 2014 for its architecture and historical associations.

Canada Border Inspection station

The Canada border station is one of the few on the border that is larger than the US station. It includes two buildings.  The current border station was built in 2007.  Prior to that, Canada used a 1950s-era brick facade template similar to that still in use at the Piegan–Carway Border Crossing.

See also
 List of Canada–United States border crossings
 National Register of Historic Places listings in Aroostook County, Maine

References

Canada–United States border crossings
Transportation buildings and structures in Aroostook County, Maine
Fort Fairfield, Maine
Government buildings on the National Register of Historic Places in Maine
Transport in Victoria County, New Brunswick
Buildings and structures in Victoria County, New Brunswick
National Register of Historic Places in Aroostook County, Maine
1873 establishments in Maine
1873 establishments in New Brunswick